And the Forests Dream Eternally is the debut EP by Polish extreme metal band Behemoth. It was released in August 1995 through Italian label Enthopy Records.

The EP was recorded in July 1994 in Warrior Studio.

"Pure Evil and Hate" is a tribute to Bathory. It is one of the band's most popular songs and is often a closer for live performances.

The EP was re-released in 1997 by Last Episode Records in a split with Forbidden Spaces by Polish black metal band Damnation. It was re-issued again in 2005, with the tracks from another Behemoth EP, Bewitching the Pomerania, as bonus tracks. On 18 September 2020 the EP was re-released again, by Metal Blade Records. This re-issue included nine bonus tracks and came in different coloured vinyl and double CD format.

Track listing

Personnel

Charts

Release history

References 

Behemoth (band) EPs
1993 EPs
Albums produced by Adam Darski